Empi Baryeh (born 18 September) is a Ghanaian-born contemporary romance novelist who is currently an assistant registrar of the University of Ghana.

Biography
Baryeh began her writing career at the age of 13 after coming across an uncompleted young adult story her sister had started. Her interest drove her to complete writing her sister's story.

Baryeh is married with two children.

Selected works
 2012: Most Eligible Bachelor
 2015: Chancing Faith
 Forest Girl
 His Inherited Princess

Awards
 Ufere Award for 2017 Book of the year

References

External links 
 Official website
 Empi Baryeh at Twitter

Year of birth missing (living people)
Living people
21st-century Ghanaian women writers
21st-century Ghanaian writers
Ghanaian novelists